Shyraa Roy (Punjabi) is a Pakistani singer, actress and producer based in Dubai. She is known for being the first Miss Trans Pakistan for 2021 and 2022 to be crowned in Pakistan. She made her debut in Pakistani cinema through vikram bhatt’s feature film Sanak in 2023.

Early life

Roy was born into a Muslim family in Sialkot, Punjab, Pakistan on 25 October 1995. She is a student of Anwar Rafi who has been ruling the music industry of Pakistan for years and who is a student of legendary Mohammad Rafi. On 26 September 2020 Roy revealed to independent Urdu that she is a gender dysphoric transgender women. She was badly criticised over social media and trolled down. Roy broke the stereotypes by giving a music release on 21 February 2021 by the name Kamli through ARY Films. Roy created a new trend in Pakistan by her music video release in cinema of Dha Lahore called Duniya where media praised her by doing a big premiere just like any full-length movie theatrical release.

Career

Miss Trans Pakistan 
On 25 May 2021, Roy was crowned Miss Trans Pakistan at the Swiss Lounge in Lahore, Pakistan. This pageant was an extension to Miss Pakistan World where in 2021,The pageant was open to Transwomen. She made history as the first trans woman to be crowned Miss Trans Pakistan. Areej Chaudhary, former Miss Pakistan World 2020, crowned the first Miss Trans Pakistan, Shyraa Roy in Pakistan. On 31 January 2022 Shyraa Roy hosted the 20th annual Miss Pakistan award ceremony in Aladdin Lounge in Lahore and crowned the newly titled Mrs Pakistan World 2022 Nida Khan & Mr Pakistan World Ataullah Gujjar from Faisalabad in the event.

Music & Film Work
Shyraa is an aspiring singer and actress and has come in various different roles in movies like Aks, Mohini in Mohenjodaro and Natasha in Saaho. She sang in music singles like "Raat, Kamli" in 2020, meanwhile she started working in an Indian web series by Ursula Manvatkar’s Hello Shabnam. She was featured in 2021 with Pakistani singer Mohsin Abbas Haider in a duet. On 31 December 2022 Shyraa shared the first-look poster of her upcoming feature movie Sanak as a lead heroine and producer.

Filmography

Discography

Soundtracks 

Singles

Covers

Awards and nominations

References

External links 

Living people
1995 births
Pakistani beauty pageant winners
Pakistani women classical musicians
Punjabi people
21st-century Pakistani actresses
21st-century Pakistani women singers
Pakistani LGBT singers
Pakistani LGBT actors
Pakistani transgender people
Transgender actresses
Transgender female models
Transgender women musicians
Transgender singers